Union Mill (also known as Union Mills) is an unincorporated community in Thurston County, in the U.S. state of Washington. The city of Lacey is immediately to the west with Musroom Corner and access to Washington State Route 510 to the north.

History
Union Mill had its start in 1901 and the community took its name from Union Mills, a local sawmill. A post office called Union Mill was established in 1911, and remained in operation until 1931.

References

Unincorporated communities in Thurston County, Washington
Unincorporated communities in Washington (state)